Alexander 'Sandy' Brown (born 7 October 1950) is a Scottish former first-class cricketer.

Brown was born at Coatbridge in October 1950. He was educated in Coatbridge at St Patrick's School, before going up to Bell College of Technology in Hamilton. A wicket-keeper who played club cricket for both Drumpellier Cricket Club and Uddingston Cricket Club, Brown first played for Scotland in a first-class match against Ireland at Dublin in 1977. He played for Scotland until 1987, making nine first-class appearances, eight of which came against Ireland, and one against the touring New Zealanders. In List A one-day cricket he made 21 appearances across the Benson & Hedges Cup and the NatWest Trophy. Brown scored 256 runs in first-class cricket at an average of 19.69, with two half centuries and a highest score of 74; as wicket-keeper, he took 13 catches and made three stumpings. In one-day cricket, he scored 281 runs at an average of 14.05, with a highest score of 47; as wicket-keeper he took 15 catches and made three stumpings.

References

External links
 

1950 births
Living people
Sportspeople from Coatbridge
Scottish cricketers